Kensaleyre is a scattered crofting township, part of a group of settlements clustered around the A87 road on the shore of Loch Snizort Beag on the Trotternish peninsula of the island of Skye in the  Highlands and Islands of Scotland. It is in the council area of Highland.

References

Populated places in the Isle of Skye